Yubi, formerly known as CredAvenue, is an Indian fintech company that connects businesses with financial institutions, banks and other lenders through its digital platform. It was founded by Gaurav Kumar and is headquartered in Chennai, India. In March 2022, it became a unicorn company with a valuation of US$1.3 billion.

The company also has offices in Bengaluru, Chennai, Delhi and Mumbai. It also operates in the MENA region. It has facilitated transactions worth around $11.3 billion to help around 2,200 institutional borrowers and 1.1 million retail borrowers as of January 2022.

History 
The company was founded as CredAvenue in 2020 by Gaurav Kumar, who earlier founded Vivriti Capital (2017) and Vivriti Asset Management (2017).

In October 2021, Yubi set up a technology centre in Bangalore that houses Marketplace, Mobile Engineering, Loans, and User Platform teams.

In April 2022, it launched Yubi Build, a real estate and infrastructure financing platform. In May 2022, the company was rebranded as Yubi. In October 2022, it entered the Middle East and North Africa (MENA) region by setting up a subsidiary for its group company Spocto in Dubai. The company has more than 500 lenders using its platform including banks such as Federal Bank, ICICI Bank, State Bank of India, Axis Bank, Kotak Mahindra Bank, SBM Bank India, Indian Bank and Union Bank of India.

Acquisition 
In February 2022, Yubi acquired a 75.1% stake in Spocto, a Mumbai-based artificial intelligence and machine learning-powered debt recovery platform for 400 crore. In April 2022, it acquired a majority stake in Corpository, a corporate credit underwriting company, at a valuation of 100 crores.

Products 
Yubi provides services for six different debt products, which include Yubi Loans (Corporate loan marketplace), YubiCo. Lend (Co-lending partnerships for banks and NBFCs), Yubi Invest (Bond Issuance and investment for institutional and retail participants), Yubi Flow (Trade financing solutions), Yubi Pools (Securitization and portfolio buyouts) and Yubi Build (Real estate financing).

Finances 
In 2021, the company raised US$90 million from Sequoia Capital, Lightspeed Venture Partners, TVS Capital Funds and Lightrock. It was the largest Series A funding through equity for an Indian company in 2021. In March 2022, it became a Unicorn startup after raising $137 million in its Series B funding round led by Insight Partners, B Capital Group, Dragoneer Investment Group and existing investors.

Awards 
Yubi was awarded the IMC Digital Technology Award in 2021 from the Indian Merchants' Chamber. In 2022, it was named the Startup of the Year at Small Business Awards by the Franchise India magazine. Its founder Gaurav Kumar was inducted into the list of Fortune India'''s 40 Under 40 in 2022. Forbes India'' listed Gaurav Kumar in its Tycoons of Tomorrow 2021 list.

See also 
 List of unicorn startup companies

References

External links 
  
Financial technology
Financial services companies of India
Financial services companies established in 2020
Online financial services companies of India
2020 establishments in Tamil Nadu
Companies based in Chennai